Oops-Leon is the name given by particle physicists to what was thought to be a new subatomic particle "discovered" at Fermilab in 1976.  The E288 experiment team, a group of physicists led by Leon Lederman who worked on the E288 particle detector, announced that a particle with a mass of about 6.0 GeV, which decayed into an electron and a positron, was being produced by the Fermilab particle accelerator.  The particle's initial name was the greek letter Upsilon.  After taking further data, the group discovered that this particle did not actually exist, and the "discovery" was named "Oops-Leon" as a pun on the original name and the first name of the E288 collaboration leader.

The original publication was based on an apparent peak (resonance) in a histogram of the invariant mass of electron-positron pairs produced by protons colliding with a stationary beryllium target, implying the existence of a particle with a mass of 6 GeV which was being produced and decaying into two leptons. An analysis showed that there was "less than one chance in fifty" that the apparent resonance was simply the result of a coincidence.  Subsequent data collected by the same experiment in 1977 revealed that the resonance had been such a coincidence after all.  However, a new resonance at 9.5 GeV was discovered using the same basic logic and greater statistical certainty, and the name was reused (see Upsilon particle).  

Today's commonly accepted standard for announcing the discovery of a particle is that the number of observed events is 5 standard deviations (σ) above the expected level of the background.  Since for a normal distribution of data, the measured number of events will fall within 5σ over 99.9999% of the time, this means a less than one in a million chance that a statistical fluctuation would cause the apparent resonance.  Under this standard, the Oops-Leon "discovery" might have gone unpublished.

References

Mesons
1976 in science
Error